Georgios Pintidis (born 28 April 2000) is a German-Greek footballer who plays as a midfielder for FC 08 Villingen.

Career
Pintidis made his professional debut for FC Ingolstadt in the 2. Bundesliga on 1 December 2018, starting in the match against Hamburger SV before being substituted out in the 83rd minute for Konstantin Kerschbaumer. The home match finished as a 1–2 loss for Ingolstadt.

In July 2020, he signed for Sonnenhof Großaspach on a two-year contract.

References

External links
 Profile at DFB.de
 

2000 births
Living people
German footballers
Citizens of Greece through descent
Greek footballers
Greek expatriate footballers
German people of Greek descent
Sportspeople of Greek descent
Association football midfielders
FC Ingolstadt 04 players
SG Sonnenhof Großaspach players
2. Bundesliga players
3. Liga players
People from Breisgau-Hochschwarzwald
Sportspeople from Freiburg (region)